Jasmine Michelle Clark (born December 26, 1982) is an American scientist and politician. Clark has a PhD in microbiology from Emory University. She is a member of the Georgia House of Representatives from the 108th District, serving since January 14, 2019.

In May 2020, Clark received media attention after accusing public health officials in Georgia of "malfeasance" in how they reported COVID-19 statistics from the state. Republican Governor Brian Kemp's office denied there was any attempt to deceive the public.

As well as representing the people of Georgia's House District 108 in the Georgia State House of Representatives, Clark is a senior lecturer at the Nell Hodgson Woodruff School of Nursing. As part of her science communication, she organized the 2019 March for Science in Atlanta, Georgia.

References

External links 

Democratic Party members of the Georgia House of Representatives
Women state legislators in Georgia (U.S. state)
Living people
Emory University alumni
21st-century American politicians
21st-century American women politicians
1982 births